Ethan Zohn (born November 12, 1973) is an American motivational speaker, former professional soccer player, and reality television series contestant who won Survivor: Africa, the third season of the reality TV series Survivor. He went on to compete in Survivor: All-Stars and Survivor: Winners at War, where he placed 11th and 18th, respectively. 

After winning Survivor: Africa, Zohn co-founded Grassroot Soccer, which uses soccer to raise money and awareness to fight HIV/AIDS. In 2010, he ranked 14th in USL Second Division's Top 15 of the Decade list as one of the most influential players of the United Soccer League Second Division in the previous decade.

Soccer
Zohn was a soccer goalkeeper at Lexington High School and Vassar College, and played professionally for the Hawaii Tsunami and Cape Cod Crusaders of the United Soccer Leagues and in Zimbabwe for Highlanders F.C. He donated some of his winnings from Survivor to starting Grassroot Soccer, an organization whose goal is to "mobilize the global soccer community to combat the AIDS epidemic in Africa". Shortly after winning Survivor Africa, Ethan was hired by ESPN to serve as a sideline reporter for the US National Team's matches in the 2002 FIFA World Cup.

In 2005, Zohn began to co-host the Metro Soccer Report (later renamed MSG Soccer Report) on the MSG Network, a weekly show dedicated to New York Red Bulls (formerly MetroStars) of Major League Soccer. As of April 2006, Zohn hosts FC Fox on the Fox Soccer Channel.

For his combined humanitarian efforts to spread HIV education throughout Africa via soccer teams for youth and young adults, Zohn received the Courage of Conscience Award from The Peace Abbey in Sherborn, Massachusetts.

Survivor

Africa

As part of the Boran tribe, Zohn did not become an immediate target in the game; he was seen as a strong player who could potentially help to win many tribal immunities. When his tribe lost two back-to-back immunity challenges, he joined the majority to vote off Diane Ogden and Jessie Camacho in episodes one and two. Over the next few days, Ethan would form a long-term alliance with Lex Van den Berghe and Tom Buchanan from his Boran tribe.

But a twist in episode five saw both of Zohn's alliance members and Kelly Goldstein switch from Boran to the Samburu tribe, leaving Ethan alone with fellow Boran members Kim Johnson and Clarence Black. Two of the new Boran members from the Samburu tribe, Teresa Cooper and Frank Garrison, had an old misunderstanding with another former Samburu member, Silas Gaither. So, by consensus, after Zohn's tribe lost the immunity challenge Gaither was voted out. Both of Zohn's alliance members Buchanan and Van den Berghe remained safe on the Samburu tribe, carrying all three into the merge.

Zohn's alliance soon began to control the game, with other members Johnson and Goldsmith. They immediately targeted Black due to his physical strength, among other events that had occurred earlier in the game, and he was voted out. But Van den Berghe had received another vote at tribal council, a vote he believed had come from Goldsmith, but which actually came from Cooper. This led Van den Berghe on a witch-hunt against Goldsmith which almost led to the demise of Zohn's alliance when Goldsmith possessed the power with the other four ex-Samburu members, Cooper, Garrison, Kim Powers and Brandon Quinton. But at the last minute, Quinton switched his vote, saving Van den Berghe, and voting out Goldsmith. But this move came back to haunt Quinton when Zohn's alliance saw him as untrustworthy and voted him out at the next tribal council.

Zohn, Van den Berghe, Buchanan, and Johnson regained control of the game, outing previous Samburu members Garrison, Powers and Cooper in the next three tribal councils, carrying them into the final four. At the next immunity challenge, Johnson, the next target to be voted out, won immunity, leading to the alliance having to resort to voting one of their own out, despite the fact that the challenge contained some controversy. At any rate, Zohn joined Van den Berghe and Johnson in voting out Buchanan, carrying them into the Final Three.

At the final three immunity challenge, older tribe member Johnson outlasted the two young, fit men to win immunity in an endurance challenge. With Johnson holding the power to choose who she would sit next to in the Final Two, she chose Zohn.

In the end, Zohn beat out Johnson in a 5-2 vote to become the Sole Survivor, gaining the votes of Goldsmith, Garrison, Cooper, Buchanan, and Van den Berghe.

All-Stars

Zohn was invited to participate in Survivor: All-Stars, which he gladly accepted. Originally part of the Saboga tribe, Zohn was immediately targeted as a previous winner, along with Survivor: The Australian Outback winner Tina Wesson. When Saboga lost immunity, the rest of the tribe decided to vote out Wesson first, needing Zohn's strength to win future challenges. When Saboga lost immunity once again, Zohn was spared once more over physical liability Rudy Boesch, who had hurt his ankle previously.

In Episode 5, Zohn and the rest of the Saboga tribe were disbanded after losing a challenge. Zohn and Jerri Manthey joined the Mogo Mogo tribe, while Jenna Lewis and Rupert Boneham joined Chapera. Later in that episode, Zohn joined the rest of his new tribe to vote out Survivor: Borneo winner Richard Hatch.

In Episode 7, Zohn was on the outs when the alliance of Manthey, Lex Van den Berghe, and Shii Ann Huang left him out in their decision to vote out Colby Donaldson. Zohn was shocked at the decision, feeling betrayed by old Survivor: Africa alliance member Van den Berghe.

In Episode 8, Mogo Mogo lost immunity once again, and Zohn, the last former winner, was the sixth person voted out in 11th place, and the eighth person eliminated overall, by a vote of 4-1. He was the most successful of the four previous winners who competed on All-Stars, lasting longer than Wesson, Hatch, and Jenna Morasca, who quit the game on day 9 to be with her ailing mother.

Winners at War 

Zohn returned as a contestant on the fortieth season of Survivor, Survivor: Winners at War, where he was a member of the Sele tribe. Along with All-Stars castmate Amber Mariano, Zohn broke Kelly Wiglesworth's record for the longest gap between seasons. He was placed on the Sele tribe, where he joined an alliance of "Old-School" players formed by Rob Mariano and Parvati Shallow. Zohn was targeted by Jeremy Collins and Michele Fitzgerald shortly after as a ploy to weaken Mariano and Shallow, and he was the 4th person voted out. Zohn remained at the Edge of Extinction for the remaining duration of the season, during which he openly spoke out about his health issues and his drive to never give up. He was defeated by Tyson Apostol and Natalie Anderson respectively at the two Edge return challenges and became a permanent member of the jury on day 35. He later voted for Anderson to win the season, although she finished second to Tony Vlachos.

In 2022, the Jewish Journal named Zohn one of "The Top 10 Jewish Reality TV Stars of All Time."

Other media appearances
Zohn was a contestant on a February 28, 2005, episode of Fear Factor, in which he competed against other reality TV competition winners, including his then-girlfriend Jenna Morasca, who was the winner of Survivor: The Amazon. He finished second, losing to former Bachelorette winner Ryan Sutter. Later that year, he appeared on Kill Reality, which followed various reality television personalities as they filmed a horror movie called The Scorned.

In October 2006 Zohn appeared on an episode of the VH1 series Celebrity Paranormal Project. He and his team investigated alleged paranormal activity at the Warson Asylum for the Criminally Insane.

In 2008 Zohn hosted Earth Tripping, a six-episode TV series, in which he demonstrated how to be "an earth-friendly traveler", and shows viewers "how to employ new, natural and environmentally conscious methods when they travel". During the series Zohn visited New York City, Mexico City, Singapore, Kuala Lumpur, Santiago, Chile, and Buenos Aires, Argentina.

In 2011, Zohn and his longtime girlfriend and fellow Survivor winner Jenna Morasca participated in the 19th season of The Amazing Race. They were one of the two teams eliminated in the double-elimination leg, and finished 10th for the season after two legs.

Zohn appeared in the 11th episode of the Discovery Channel show PitchMen, in which he presented the EZ Crunch Bowl, a cereal bowl he designed to in which the cereal is kept in the shallow end and the milk in the deeper end in order to keep the cereal "crunchy" and not soggy. The bowl was picked by the show's co-stars, Billy Mays and Anthony Sullivan, for manufacturing and marketing by Telebrands. The EZ Crunch Bowl was sent to Telebrands product engineers for improvement before being made available to the public.

Zohn has co-hosted Outside Today on the cable TV network Outside Television.

Personal life

Zohn is Jewish. His father died from cancer when he was 14 years old.

On April 30, 2002, Zohn called into the Howard Stern Show and shared he was working as a motivational speaker, often in Jewish venues where he shared how Judaism helped him achieve success. He also revealed he had gone on five dates with Jennifer Love Hewitt after meeting her back stage at the Live With Regis and Kelly show, and the two were regularly in touch by telephone (at the time).

Zohn began dating fellow Survivor champion Jenna Morasca after her victory on Survivor: The Amazon in 2003. They both lived in Manhattan. In an interview on Rob Has a Podcast, it was revealed that Zohn and Morasca were considered to return in Survivor: South Pacific, after applying for The Amazing Race. The couple declined the offer, saying they were not interested in competing against each other. In February 2013, Zohn and Morasca confirmed that they had amicably ended their relationship. On July 21, 2015, Zohn announced his engagement to New York City interior designer Lisa Heywood. They were married on July 16, 2016 in North Bennington, Vermont in a Jewish ceremony.

On April 30, 2009, Zohn was diagnosed with a rare type of cancer called CD20-positive Hodgkin's lymphoma. He started chemotherapy in May 2009. On September 14, 2009, he disclosed that after three months of intensive chemotherapy, his cancer returned. He underwent a new treatment, including a stem-cell transplant, to battle the rare form of Hodgkin's disease. Zohn received a "clean CT scan" in late April 2010 and remained in remission for nearly 20 months. In September 2011, Zohn confirmed that the cancer had returned in his chest. In early March 2013, Zohn announced via The Jeff Probst Show that he was cancer-free due to two rounds of stem cell transplants that he received from his brother.

Filmography

Television

References

External links
 Official website
 Ethan Zohn biography for Survivor: Africa at CBS.com
 Ethan Zohn biography for Survivor: All-Stars at CBS.com

1973 births
The Amazing Race (American TV series) contestants
Jewish American sportspeople
American soccer players
Association football goalkeepers
Cape Cod Crusaders players
Hawaii Tsunami players
Highlanders F.C. players
Lexington High School alumni
Living people
People from Lexington, Massachusetts
Sportspeople from Middlesex County, Massachusetts
Survivor (American TV series) winners
USISL players
Vassar College alumni
Soccer players from Massachusetts
American expatriate soccer players
Expatriate footballers in Zimbabwe
American expatriates in Zimbabwe
Winners in the Survivor franchise